Milk Milk Lemonade is the fourth album by the Berkeley, California punk rock band The Mr. T Experience, released in 1992 by Lookout! Records. It was the band's last album to include guitarist Jon Von Zelowitz, who left the group later that year.

Critical reception
AllMusic wrote that the album "features a high degree of instrumental complexity, something that turned other punk rock folks off." Trouser Press wrote: "Moving a giant step forward in instrumental complexity, Milk Milk Lemonade intertwines guitars and voices with more care, skill and diversity than the band has ever previously displayed." Portland Mercury wrote that the album "remains a bona fide punk classic, and probably the band’s best-known release."

Track listing

Performers
Dr. Frank - vocals, guitar
Jon Von Zelowitz - vocals, guitar
Aaron Rubin - bass
Alex Laipeneiks - drums

Album information
Produced, engineered, and mixed by Kevin Army
Mastered by John Golden at K-Disc in Hollywood, California
Cover photo by Walt Faria
Artwork by Mark Eastman
Band photo by Ann Giordano
Art direction by Jon Von

References

The Mr. T Experience albums
1992 albums